New Guanjiao Tunnel is a tunnel on the 2nd line of Qinghai–Tibet Railway in Guanjiao Mountain, Qinghai province. It is dual-bored, double-track rail tunnel.

China Railway First Survey and Design Institute is responsible for the design. The total construction duration was projected to be 5 years. The construction started in 2007 and was completed in April 2014. The tunnel was opened on 28 December 2014.

The tunnel's northeastern portal is in Tianjun County, the southwestern portal is in Ulan County.

References 

Railway tunnels in China
Rail transport in Qinghai